Drivers Jonas was a longstanding private partnership of chartered surveyors in the United Kingdom. It was acquired by Deloitte in 2010.

History
Drivers Jonas was founded in London in 1725 by brothers, Samuel and Charles Driver.  Formerly bakers, nurserymen and landowners. The Driver family became surveyors in the first half of the 18th century -  who turned from tilling the land to measuring it. 

Samuel (II) Driver (1720–1779) was, among other occupations, a land valuer. His great-grandson Robert Collier Driver (1816–1897) was a major figure in the professionalisation of the surveying profession.His daughter Maria married Henry Jonas (d. 1928), a surveyor from a prominent Essex farming family, and the partnership was set up in 1878.

The business prospered and branched out into auctioneering and estate management and “improvement”. Properties on the firm’s books included entire villages and towns such as Wetherby and Hemel Hempstead; landed estates such as Cliveden; and London properties such as the Vaudeville Theatre and a shop in New Bond Street (let to a Mr Asprey).

Today

In January 2010, Drivers Jonas LLP merged with Deloitte LLP, combining the firm with Deloitte's property staff, creating a business group called Drivers Jonas Deloitte.
In January 2013 the business was rebranded as Deloitte Real Estate.

Today the organisation works with  clientele such as REITs, real estate funds, real estate investors, private equity investors, sovereign wealth and public pension fund investors, investment managers, property owners and managers, lenders, brokerage firms, homebuilders, development companies, and occupiers with tasks varying from advising on real asset portfolios to planning a new town or transport system. They have two business areas. The Development & Assurance team drives value creation for real assets clients by leveraging development, planning, valuation and capital markets expertise. Alongside this, the Occupiers & Capital Projects team addresses complex real asset-related business challenges by blending finance, asset management and capital projects skills.

Driver Jonas major projects
The firm was known for its public sector work, with contracts in defence, county councils, government offices and educational facilities. It advised on projects including national sports stadia, Buildings of Culture and Heritage, and the 2012 London Olympic games. Some of the more important developments that Drivers Jonas worked on are:

 Tate Modern
 Tate Britain Centenary development
 London City Airport
 Stadium of Light
 The £6bn sale of Canary Wharf for Morgan Stanley
 Martineau Galleries, Birmingham
 Snowhill, Birmingham
 QE II Conference Centre

References

External links
 Deloitte Real Estate

Property services companies of the United Kingdom
Financial services companies established in 1725
Financial services companies disestablished in 2010
Defunct companies of the United Kingdom
1725 establishments in Great Britain
Deloitte
2010 mergers and acquisitions